Adwoa Badoe is a Ghanaian teacher, writer, and dancer based in Canada.

Biography 
Adwoa was born in Ghana. She studied Human biology at the Kwame Nkrumah University of Science and Technology, and qualified as a doctor. She moved to Canada after her tertiary education in Ghana but was unable to practice as a doctor because she had to study the programme again in Canada to qualify as a doctor in Canada. She subsequently switched attention to her childhood interests, writing and storytelling. She developed her interest in writing as result of her passion to want to share stories she heard growing up. Aside writing, she attends various cultural festivals around the world. She is also a dance instructor. She organises African dance workshops for schools and libraries in her community. She is the niece of Ghanaian writer, Kate Abbam.

Works 
Badoe has authored many books in her writing career. Her books have been reviewed by newspapers such as the Toronto Star. Some of her works include;

 Crabs for Dinner, (1995);
 The Queen's New Shoes, (1998);
 Street Girls: The Project, (2001);
 The Pot of Wisdom, (2001);
 Nana's Cold Days, (2002);
 Ok to Be Sad, (2005);
 Today Child; Long As There Is Love, (2005);
 Histórias de Ananse, (with Baba Wagué Diakité and Marcelo Pen) (2006);
 Between Sisters, (2012);
 Aluta, (2016).

See also 

 List of Ghanaian writers

References 

Kwame Nkrumah University of Science and Technology alumni
Living people
Year of birth missing (living people)
20th-century Ghanaian writers
21st-century Ghanaian writers
Ghanaian women novelists
20th-century Ghanaian women writers
21st-century Ghanaian women writers
Ghanaian novelists
Ghanaian dancers
Ghanaian medical doctors